Agua Dulce High School is a public high school located in the city of Agua Dulce, Texas and classified as a 2A school by the UIL.  It is a part of the Agua Dulce Independent School District located in western Nueces County and eastern Jim Wells County.   In 2015, the school was rated "Met Standard" by the Texas Education Agency.

Athletics
The Agua Dulce Longhorns compete in these sports 

Volleyball, Cross Country, Football, Basketball, Powerlifting, Golf, Track & Baseball

References

External links
Agua Dulce ISD website

Public high schools in Texas
Schools in Nueces County, Texas